Lena Marie Strömdahl (born 17 July 1947 in Lidingö, Sweden) is a Swedish actress.

Filmography

Film
Werther (1990) - Martha
Honungsvargar (1990) - Festdeltagare
T. Sventon och fallet Isabella (1991) - Miss Rita Gustavsson-Rinaldo
Hammar (1992) - Dr. Morell
Night of the Orangutan (1992) - Aunt
Där regnbågen slutar (1999) - Sköterskan
Percy, Buffalo Bill och jag (2005) - Farmor
Järnets änglar (2007) - Social assistant
Rallybrudar (2008) - Husmor
Göta kanal 3: Kanalkungens hemlighet (2009) - Kvinnlig arkivarie
The Girl with the Dragon Tattoo (2011) - Mildred
Miraklet i Viskan (2015) - Anny

Television
Babels hus (1981) - Night nurse
Hassel: Utpressarna (1992, TV Movie) - Louise Edberg
Rederiet (1992-1996) - Yvonne Almkvist-Dahlén-Bjurhed
Woman with Birthmark (2001)
Pusselbitar (2001) - Logoped
Wallander (2005) - Maj Nilsson
Kommissionen (2005) - Monika, socialminister

External links
Swedish Film Database

People from Lidingö Municipality
1947 births
Living people
Swedish actresses